Heinasoo is a settlement in Võru Parish, Võru County in southeastern Estonia speaking the language Võro.

References

Villages in Võru County